Pitts Modern School is located in Gomia in the Bokaro district of Jharkhand, India.

It was established on 8 December 1967 by Sir Cyril A. Pitts, former chairperson of the ICI India Limited, a division of Imperial Chemical Industries, a United Kingdom-based chemical company.

ICI is now Indian Explosives Limited (IEL), which is a joint venture between ICI India and Orica Limited, an Australian-based multinational corporation that manufactures various chemical products.

Although the school is managed by the Gomia School Society with the Bishop of Chota-Nagpur as its chairperson, the board members also include some of the contributing senior officers of IEL-Gomia.

It is permanently affiliated with India's Central Board of Secondary Education and is an English medium school with students from kindergarten through class XII.

At the 10+2 level, all streams of science, commerce and humanities are available as options. CCE has been implemented in classes I to X. At the plus two level are English, Physics, Chemistry, Mathematics, Biology, Computer Science, Accountancy, Business Studies, Economics, Fine Arts and Hindi, with a highly sophisticated language laboratory (based on TOEFL) et al.
Some of the class rooms have CCD video cameras with speaker facilities.
Although the school started with only 50 students and 6 staff members, today it has approximately 2000 students and a staff of approximately 80.

It has a very rich and enviable academic and co-curricular history. Apart from being mentioned as the nationwide 'Model School/Institution' twice in the education bill presented in the parliament, it is also one of the very few (20 odd) schools all over the country to have 'permanent affiliation' from CBSE, New Delhi.

Principals
 Mr. Sadiqque
 Lt. Col. D. N. Sahani
 Mr. J. R. Parashar
 Mr. Jaswant Singh
 Mr. Arvind Kumar Sinha
 Mr. Manoj Kumar Upadhayay

Vice Chairmans 
 Mr. SMZ Hassan
 Mr. K J Koruth
 Mr. D C Mahato
 Mr. Ravi Pratap Sinha 
 Mr. Rajesh Sharma
 Mr. B K Dubey

See also
Education in India
Literacy in India
List of schools in India

References

External links
 Webpage about Gomia
  PMS Webpage

 

Schools in Jharkhand
Education in Bokaro Steel City